Alexander Olcott (August 10, 1829 – April 21, 1887) was an American politician who served as a member of the New York State Legislature in 1864 and 1865.

Life 
Olcott was born on August 10, 1829 in Corning, New York. He married Catherine Amanda Olcott in 1856. The couple had two children, Marvin and Mary. He died in 1887 at the age of 57, and was buried in South Corning.

References 

1829 births
1887 deaths
Members of the New York State Assembly
Politicians from Corning, New York
19th-century American politicians